The International Register of the UNESCO Memory of the World-Programme includes inscriptions from Europe and North America. , the region has 274 (or 52%) inscriptions of the 432 total inscriptions included in the Register.

The first inscriptions on the UNESCO Memory of the World Register were made in 1997. By creating a compendium of the world's documentary heritage – such as manuscripts, oral traditions, audio-visual materials, and library and archive holdings – the program aims to tap on its networks of experts to exchange information and raise resources for the preservation, digitization, and dissemination of documentary materials. Among the various properties in the Register include recordings of folk music; ancient languages and phonetics; aged remnants of religious and secular manuscripts; collective lifetime works of renowned giants of literature; science and music; copies of landmark motion pictures and short films; and accounts documenting changes in the world's political, economic, and social stage.

Number of inscriptions by country 
, the region has 274 (or 52%) inscriptions of the 432 total inscriptions included in the Register.

Inscriptions by country/territory

See also 
UK Memory of the World Register

Notes

A. Names and spellings provided are based on the official list released by the Memory of the World Programme.

References

External links
 UNESCO Memory of the World Programme official website
 UNESCO Memory of the World International Register – Europe and North America